Psocus is a genus of common barklice in the family Psocidae. There are about 17 described species in Psocus (the genus has been redefined more narrowly, after many unrelated species were described under its name).

Species
These 17 species belong to the genus Psocus:

 Psocus alticolus Banks, 1937
 Psocus bipunctatus (Linnaeus, 1761)
 Psocus crosbyi Chapman, 1930
 Psocus cyllarus Banks, 1941
 Psocus dolorosus Banks, 1937
 Psocus illotus Banks, 1939
 Psocus incomptus Banks, 1937
 Psocus jeanneli Badonnel, 1945
 Psocus lapidarius Badonnel, 1936
 Psocus leidyi Aaron, 1886
 Psocus mucronicaudatus Li, 2002
 Psocus omissus Banks, 1939
 Psocus oneitus Banks, 1941
 Psocus rizali Banks, 1939
 Psocus saghaliensis Okamoto & Kuwayama, 1924
 Psocus socialis Li, 1997
 Psocus vannivalvulus Li, 1995

References

External links

 

Psocidae
Articles created by Qbugbot